Louise Harrison (born Louise Anna Imogen Harrison) in  Bowdon, Cheshire, is a British actress who trained at the Royal Welsh College of Music and Drama. She is best known for her role as PC Donna Harris in the long running ITV drama The Bill and Dawn Prescott in Coronation Street. She has also appeared in various other TV dramas and on stage. Not to be confused with Louise Harrison who is George Harrison’s older sister who passed on 1/2/2023 aged 91. 

Spouse - John Eastwood 2002 to his death in 2022 .

Acting career 
Her first role was in the series A Very Peculiar Practice, where she played Suzanne. Shortly after she went on to play her first regular role as Dawn Prescott in Coronation Street and then a couple of years later joined the cast of The Bill as PC Donna Harris who she played for five years. She has appeared in other television dramas and on stage including at the Royal Exchange Theatre, Manchester.

In 2020, Louise Harrison discussed her life and career during an in-depth interview for The Bill Podcast

References

External links 
A Biography

1962 births
Actresses from Manchester
People from Wythenshawe
English film actresses
English stage actresses
English television actresses
English film producers
Living people
Alumni of the Royal Welsh College of Music & Drama
20th-century English actresses
21st-century English actresses